Dieter Prestin (born 23 August 1956) is a retired German football player. He spent 14 seasons in the Bundesliga with 1. FC Köln.

Honours
 UEFA Cup finalist: 1985–86
 Bundesliga champion: 1977–78
 Bundesliga runner-up: 1981–82, 1988–89
 DFB-Pokal winner: 1976–77, 1977–78, 1982–83
 DFB-Pokal finalist: 1979–80

References

External links
 

1956 births
Living people
German footballers
1. FC Köln players
Bundesliga players
Association football defenders
People from Rhein-Erft-Kreis
Sportspeople from Cologne (region)
Footballers from North Rhine-Westphalia
West German footballers